is a Japanese OVA miniseries of six episodes loosely based on the OVA series Sol Bianca and employing computer generated animation. This version is a re-imagining of the ship and crew of Sol Bianca, and does not follow the continuity of the original (as well as leaving plot threads of the original show unresolved). Sol Bianca: The Legacy combines 3D graphics with 2D animation, particularly in rendering spaceships such as the Sol Bianca itself.

Plot 
Thousands of years into the future, mankind has colonized other planets across the galaxy and completely forgotten about Earth. On one part of the galaxy, the female space pirates and their colossal starship Sol Bianca get a surprise when a young girl named May stows away on board the ship. The crew then embarks on a journey to Earth to find the whereabouts of May's parents and discover the secrets of the lost planet.

Characters 
 April Bikirk
 

 Feb Fall
 

 Janny Mann
 

 June Ashel
 

 May Jessica
 

 Rammy

Theme music 
The English opening theme is "To Be Free" by Stella Furst. The closing themes are "You're Not Alone" by Kryie and "To Be Free" by Stella Furst.

Novel 
A novel was released on November 4, 1999 called  by ASCII of Kenji Obayashi illustrated for Naoyuki Onda. The book has 221 pages. The story starts 4 hundreds of years after humanity spread out into the galaxy. This is different from the thousands of years reference in the original Sol Bianca.

Reception

References 

 Jonathan Clements and Helen McCarthy. The Anime Encyclopedia: A Guide to Japanese Animation Since 1917. New York: Stone Bridge Press (2001)

External links 
 "The Anime Encyclopedia: A Guide to Japanese Animation Since 1917"
 

1999 anime OVAs
Anime International Company
Geneon USA
NBCUniversal Entertainment Japan
Science fiction anime and manga